Emtricitabine/tenofovir, sold under the brand name Truvada among others, is a fixed-dose combination antiretroviral medication used to treat and prevent HIV/AIDS. It contains the antiretroviral medications emtricitabine and tenofovir disoproxil. For treatment, it must be used in combination with other antiretroviral medications. For prevention before exposure, in those who are at high risk, it is recommended along with safer sex practices. It does not cure HIV/AIDS. Emtricitabine/tenofovir is taken by mouth.

Common side effects include headache, tiredness, trouble sleeping, abdominal pain, weight loss, and rash. Serious side effects may include high blood lactate levels and enlargement of the liver. Use of this medication during pregnancy does not appear to harm the fetus, but this has not been well studied.

Emtricitabine/tenofovir was approved for medical use in the United States in 2004. It is on the World Health Organization's List of Essential Medicines. In the United States, emtricitabine/tenofovir was under patent until 2020, but is now available as a generic worldwide. In 2020, it was the 278th most commonly prescribed medication in the United States, with more than 1million prescriptions.

Medical uses 
Emtricitabine/tenofovir is used both to treat and to prevent HIV/AIDS. The U.S. National Institutes of Health (NIH) recommends antiretroviral therapy (ART) for all people with HIV/AIDS.

HIV prevention
The Centers for Disease Control and Prevention (CDC) recommends the use of emtricitabine/tenofovir for pre-exposure prophylaxis (PrEP) for uninfected, HIV-1 negative individuals that may be at risk for HIV-1 infection. A Cochrane systematic review found a 51% relative risk reduction of contracting HIV with both tenofovir alone and the tenofovir/emtricitabine combination. A JAMA systematic review found a similar relative risk reduction of 54% on average and greater reduction with greater adherence. It was approved for PrEP against HIV infection in the United States in 2012.

The CDC recommends PrEP be considered for the following high-risk groups:
 Individuals in an ongoing sexual relationship with an HIV-positive partner
 Gay or bisexual men who either have had anal sex without a condom or been diagnosed with an STD in the past six months
 Heterosexual men or women who do not regularly use condoms during sex with partners of unknown HIV status who are substantial risk
 Injection of drugs in the last six months with sharing of equipment
 Serodiscordant heterosexual and homosexual partners. where one partner is HIV-positive and the other HIV-negative

The consideration of utilizing emtricitabine/tenofovir as a reduction strategy involves discussion with a health professional who can help the patient navigate the benefits and risks. Patients are advised to discuss any history of bone issues, kidney issues, or hepatitis B infection with their health care provider. Effectiveness of PrEP for prevention of infection is reliant on an individual's ability to take the medication consistently.

Emtricitabine/tenofovir is also used for HIV post-exposure prophylaxis. People who start taking emtricitabine/tenofovir see HIV reduction benefit up to 72 hours after starting, but the medicine must be taken for thirty days after a high-risk sexual event to ensure HIV transmission levels are optimally reduced.

Truvada as PrEP should not be used for individuals that are positive for HIV-1.

HIV treatment 
Emtricitabine/tenofovir has been approved in the United States as part of antiretroviral combination therapy for the treatment of HIV-1. The combination therapy is suggested as one of the options for adults who have not received any prior treatment for HIV infection.

Hepatitis B 
Both emtricitabine and tenofovir are indicated for the treatment of hepatitis B, with the added benefit that they can target HIV for those with co-infection. Emtricitabine/tenofovir may also be considered for some antiviral resistant hepatitis B infections.

Pregnancy and breastfeeding 
In the United States, it is recommend that all pregnant HIV-infected women start antiretroviral therapy (ART) as early in pregnancy as possible to reduce risk of transmission. ART generally does not increase risk of birth defects with exception of dolutegravir, which is not recommended during first trimester of pregnancy only due to potential risk of neural tube defects.

Emtricitabine/tenofovir is secreted in breast milk. In developed countries, HIV-infected mothers are generally recommended to not breastfeed due to slight risk of mother-to-children HIV transmission. In developing countries, where avoiding breastfeeding may not be an option, the World Health Organization recommends a triple drug regimen of tenofovir, efavirenz, and either lamivudine or emtricitabine.

Side effects

Emtricitabine/tenofovir is generally well tolerated. Some of its side effects include:
 Rare: lactic acidosis, liver dysfunction, worsening of hepatitis B infection
 Common: headache, abdominal pain, decreased weight, nausea, diarrhea, and decreased bone density

Fat redistribution and accumulation (lipodystrophy) has been observed in people receiving antiretroviral therapy, including fat reductions in the face, limbs, and buttocks and increases in visceral fat of the abdomen and accumulations in the upper back. When used as pre-exposure prophylaxis (PrEP) this effect may not be present. Weight changes have however been linked to the medication.

Drug interactions

Other drugs with adverse reactions include dabigatran etexilate, lamivudine, and vincristine. Dabigatran etexilate used with p-glycoprotein inducers require monitoring of decreased levels and effects of dabigatran. Lamivudine may increase the adverse or toxic effect of emtricitabine. Vincristine used with P-glycoprotein/ABCB1 inducers can decrease the serum concentration of vincristine.

Society and culture

The patent for the drug combination is owned by Gilead Sciences in some regions. The European patent  EP0915894B1 expired in July 2018, Gilead Sciences wished the patent to be extended, however "four rival labs—Teva, Accord Healthcare, Lupin and Mylan—had sought to have that overturned in the courts in Britain", the High Court of England and Wales invalidated Gilead's patent, however the company appealed  and the UK referred the case to the European Court of Justice who refused to extend the patent. An Irish court rejected an injunction request to prevent the launch of generic Emtricitabine/tenofovir prior to the resolution of the case. Despite the expiration of the Gilead Sciences patent, as of 2021, there are still widespread challenges to the availability and uptake of generic PrEP throughout Europe. 

In 2019, Gilead Sciences challenged the validity of patents granted to the United States after 2015 for using the drug combination for HIV PrEP and post-exposure prophylaxis (PEP).

In the United States, most healthcare plans are required to cover PrEP without any copay or other cost sharing. This is due to a United States Preventive Services Task Force recommendation that gave PrEP a grade A rating. Under the Affordable Care Act, this recommendation requires all non-grandfathered private health plans to cover PrEP without cost sharing.

In the United Kingdom, PrEP is widely available to all at risk groups following the Department for Health and Social Care's decision to make it available across England from 2020. Wales, Scotland, and Northern Ireland made it available in 2017 and 2018.

References

External links
 

Fixed dose combination (antiretroviral)
Gilead Sciences
Hepatotoxins
Pre-exposure prophylaxis
Wikipedia medicine articles ready to translate
World Health Organization essential medicines